Facial onset sensory and motor neuronopathy, often abbreviated FOSMN,  is an extremely rare disease characterised by sensory and motor loss beginning in the face and spreading to involve an increasingly larger area including the upper arms. Details of the disease, and in particular its aetiology, are currently subject to debate, mainly because FOSMN syndrome is so rare. FOSMN was first described in four patients in 2006  and subsequently in a further six patients  but so far, these ten represent the only reported cases.

Signs and symptoms
Sensory loss develops over the distribution of the trigeminal nerve and then spreads to involve the scalp and neck. Ultimately paraesthesiae spreads down to the arms. Sensory symptoms are followed by motor deficits which also begin in the face. Motor manifestations are characterised by weakness, atrophy, cramping and fasciculations. Difficulty swallowing and speaking may also develop. Neurophysiology studies show a generalized sensory motor neuronopathy which is most severe cranially.

These features lead FOSMN syndrome to be classed as one of the 'syringomyelia-like' syndromes, a group which also includes Tangier disease.

Cause
An immune-mediated component to FOSMN has been suggested based on the response to treatment but so far this has only been described in a single patient.

The specific neuronal subtypes involved in the disease are not clear. Although most features of FOSMN reflect lower motor neuron impairment some findings have suggested upper motor neuron impairment in FOSMN. Involvement of both UMN and LMN might suggest a link between FOSMN and other, better characterised diseases such as amyotrophic lateral sclerosis.

Treatment

References

External links 

Rare syndromes
Syndromes affecting the nervous system